National Militia (Spanish: Milicia Nacional) may refer to
 Venezuelan National Militia (Venezuela, 2009–)
 National Militia (Spain, 17th–18th century)
 National Militia (Ukraine, 2017–)
 Ukrainian National Militia (Ukraine, 1941)